Lac Seul is a large, crescent shaped reservoir in Kenora District, northwestern Ontario, Canada. It has a maximum (regulated) depth of 47.2 m, with a surface elevation of 357 m above sea level. Its level is raised in the summer and then drawn down in the winter months to reach points of as low as 16 feet below the maximum level. It is the second largest body of water entirely within the province of Ontario (Lake Nipigon being first). The lake consists of open water bays, narrow channels, and islands. It is a relatively shallow lake with many rock shoals. This provides a good habitat for walleye (also known as "yellow pickerel") and northern pike as well as yellow perch. During the Lac Seul project of 1968-1972 no muskelunge were noted in the catches of research nets set over those years. Significant numbers of whitefish, tullibee, burbot and cisco were noted as well although they infrequently were noted in the sport fishery. Lac Seul is noted for offering some of the best fishing in Ontario.

Lac Seul is located on the former lake bed of Glacial Lake Agassiz.  Owing to this previous lake, much of the bottom of Lac Seul is covered with thick deposits of lacustrine silts and varved clay of varying thickness.  The water of Lac Seul is tea colored.  In clear water Walleye only feed at dusk and dawn because of their light-sensitive eyes, but because of the tea color of Lac Seul, it provides excellent Walleye and Northern Pike angling opportunities throughout the day.

Lac Seul provides some of the finest trophy Northern Pike and Walleye and also provides access to the vast, practically untouched wilderness surrounding it.

The numerous islands on Lac Seul are considered regionally significant calving habitat for the rare boreal woodland caribou.

The natural capacity of Lac Seul is augmented by the diversion of water from the Albany River drainage basin at Lake St. Joseph, allowing hydroelectric stations at Ear Falls where the English River leaves the lake, and Manitou Falls, 30 km downstream, to generate 90600 kW of electricity.

In fur trade days it was part of a canoe route west from James Bay: James Bay, Albany River, Lake St. Joseph, portage, Lac Seul, English River (Ontario), Winnipeg River, Lake Winnipeg.

Nearby communities
 Ear Falls, Ontario
 Goldpines, Ontario
 Lac Seul First Nation - Lac Seul 28 Indian Reserve
 Lac Seul Post, Ontario
 Sioux Lookout, Ontario
 Wabauskang First Nation - Wabauskang 21 Indian Reserve
 Hudson, Kenora District, Ontario

Tributaries
Vermilion River

See also
List of lakes in Ontario

Seul
Hudson's Bay Company trading posts